Falsilunatia scotianus is a species of predatory sea snail, a marine gastropod mollusk in the family Naticidae, the moon snails.

Description 

Habitat 

References

 Torigoe K. & Inaba A. (2011) Revision on the classification of Recent Naticidae. Bulletin of the Nishinomiya Shell Museum 7: 133 + 15 pp., 4 pls.

Naticidae
Gastropods described in 1990